Delphinulopsidae is an extinct taxonomic family of fossil sea snails, marine, gastropod mollusks.

Taxonomy 
According to taxonomy of the Gastropoda by Bouchet & Rocroi (2005) the family Delphinulopsidae has no subfamilies.

2007 taxonomy 
The following two subfamilies have been recognized in Delphinulopsidae by Bandel (2007):

 subfamily Delphinulopsinae Blodgett, Frýda & Stanley, 2001
 subfamily Platychilininae Bandel, 2007

Genera 
Genera within Delphinulopsidae include:

Delphinulopsinae
 Delphinulopsis Laube, 1868 - type genus
 Delphinulopsis binodosa (Münster, 1841) - type species
 Schwardtopsis Bandel, 2007
 Schwardtopsis münsteri (Klipstein, 1843) - synonym: Fossariopsis münsteri (Klipstein, 1843) - type species

Platychilininae
 Platychilina Koken, 1892 - type genus
 Platychilina pustulosa Münster, 1841
 Platychilina wöhrmanni Koken, 1892 - type species
 Marmolatella Kittl, 1894
 Marmolatella ampliata
 Marmolatella stomatia - synonym: Ostrea stomatia Stoppani, 1858 - type species
 Marmolatella fenestrata (Laube, 1869)

References